This is an index of Egyptian mythology articles.

Many synonyms exist for Egyptian deities; what follows is a list of each distinct entry, and does not contain any synonyms of the names for deities.

Concepts
Afterlife – Ancient Egyptian concept of the soul – Isfet – Maat

Deities

Aken – Aker – Akhty – Am-heh – Amun – Amunet – Ammit – Anat – Andjety – Anhur – Anput – Anubis – Anuket – Apedemak – Apep – Apis – Aqen – Arensnuphis – Ash – Astarte – Aten – Atum – Babi – Banebdjedet – Bakha – Ba-Pef – Bastet – Bat – Bata – Bennu – Bes – Dedun – Duamutef – Geb – Ha – Hapy – Hathor – Hatmehit – Hedetet – Hedjhotep – Heh – Heka – Hemen – Hemsut – Heqet – Heryshaf – Hesat – Horus – Hu – Iabet – Iah – Iat – Ihy – Imentet – Imhotep – Imset – Isis – Iunit – Iusaaset – Kebechet – Kek – Khensit – Khenti-Amentiu – Khenti-kheti – Khepri – Khnum – Khonsu – Maahes – Maat – Mafdet – Medjed – Mehen – Mehit – Menhit – Meret – Meretseger – Meskhenet – Min – Mnevis – Montu – Mut – Nebethetepet – Nebtuwi – Nefertem – Nehebkau – Neith – Nekhbet – Nemty – Neper – Nephthys – Nu – Nut – Osiris – Pakhet – Petbe – Ptah – Qebehsenuef – Qebui – Qetesh – Ra – Raet-Tawy – Rem – Renenutet – Renpet – Repyt – Resheph – Sah – Shai – Satet – Seker – Sekhmet – Serapis – Serket – Seshat – Shed – Shezmu – Set – Shu – Sia – Sobek – Sopdet – Sopdu – Tatenen – Taweret – Tayt – Tefnut – Tenenet – Thoth – Tjenenyet – Tutu – Unut – Wadjet – Wadj-wer – Weneg – Wepset – Wepwawet – Werethekau – Wosret

Groups of deities
Assessors of Maat – Cavern deities – Ennead – Four sons of Horus – Gate deities – Ogdoad – Theban Triad

Mythical creatures

Aani – Abtu – Griffin – Hieracosphinx – Medjed – Serpopard – Set animal – Sphinx

Myths
Creation myths – Osiris myth

Places
Aaru – Akhet – Benben – Duat – Land of Manu – Neter-khertet

Symbols
Ankh – Crook and flail – Djed – Eye of Horus – Eye of Ra – Hennu – Horns of Ammon – Imiut fetish – Nebu – Ouroboros – Scarab – Tyet – Uraeus – Was – Winged sun

Texts
Book of the Dead – Book of the Dead spells – Book of Gates – Book of Thoth – The Contendings of Horus and Seth – Great Hymn to the Aten

Other
Atef – Solar barque – Souls of Pe and Nekhen

See also

 Ancient Egyptian deities
 List of Egyptian deities
 Numbers in Egyptian mythology

I
Mythology

Egyptian Mythology Articles

als:Liste ägyptischer Götter
bg:Египетски божества по азбучен ред
cs:Seznam egyptských bohů
de:Liste ägyptischer Götter
es:Anexo:Dioses egipcios
fr:Dieux égyptiens par ordre alphabétique
nl:Egyptische mythologie#Goden
pl:Bogowie starożytnego Egiptu
ru:Список египетских богов
szl:Bogi starożytnygo Egiptu
sr:Списак египатских божанстава